The Sintura S99 is a purpose-built grand tourer-style race car, originally based on the Harrier LR9C, which was designed, developed and produced by British engineer Lester Ray, and tuned by German tuning company Freisinger. It was introduced in 1999, and built to GT1 regulations.

References

Grand tourer racing cars